Stanley Wayne Mathis (born December 1, 1955) is an American actor, singer, and dancer. He played the character Schroeder in the 1999 revival of Clark Gesner's You're A Good Man, Charlie Brown.

Career
Mathis played Paul in the revival of Kiss Me, Kate. Additional Broadway credits include the revival of Wonderful Town, Jelly's Last Jam, and Oh, Kay!.

In 1997 Mathis appeared as Banzai in the original Broadway cast of The Lion King, a musical adaptation of the 1994 Disney animated film of the same name.

In 2009 he was in a Yale Repertory production of Death of a Salesman by Arthur Miller, playing the role of Stanley.

He starred on Broadway in the musical comedy Nice Work if You Can Get It costarring Matthew Broderick and Kelli O'Hara.

He starred in The Book of Mormon on Broadway as Mafala Hatimbi succeeding Michael Potts.

References

External links
 
 

American male musical theatre actors
American tenors
Living people
Place of birth missing (living people)
1955 births